Jan-Gunnar Winther (born 21 June 1962) is Director of the Norwegian Centre for the Ocean and the Arctic at UiT The Arctic University of Norway and Specialist Director at the Norwegian Polar Institute located in Tromsø.

After obtaining a construction engineering degree in 1987 at the Norwegian Institute of Technology, Jan-Gunnar Winther gained a PhD in polar hydrology at the same institution in 1993 following a period of study at the University of British Columbia in Canada. He began working at the Norwegian Polar Institute in 1994, and was its director from 2005 to 2017. From 2018, Winther is director of the Centre for the Ocean and the Arctic under the Ministry of Trade, Industry and Fisheries. He was a researcher at SINTEF (Foundation for Scientific and Industrial Research) for six years, held a chair at the University Centre in Svalbard and enrolled at the Norwegian Defence University College in 2003 and 2013. He has been deputy head of the government-appointed “group of experts for the northern regions” under the second government of prime minister Jens Stoltenberg.

Winther led the Norwegian-American South Pole Expedition in the 2007–09 International Polar Year. He took the initiative leading to the Nansen-Amundsen Year in 2011, an official celebration with around 400 events nationally and internationally, acknowledging 150 years after Fridtjof Nansen was born and 100 years after Roald Amundsen reached the South Pole. Winther participated in the anniversary expedition to the South Pole in 2011 along with Stein P. Aasheim, Harald Dag Jølle and Vegard Ulvang. The expedition followed the same route as Roald Amundsen’s expedition in 1911–12 and reached the Pole precisely 100 years after Amundsen as part of the celebration of the Nansen-Amundsen Year in 2011. In 2013, he led the International Nansen Memorial Expedition from Archangel to the Yenisei River aboard the former Russian research vessel Professor Molchanov. He took part on behalf of Norway in the Olympic Torch Relay prior to the Winter Olympics in Sochi in 2014 when it visited the North Pole in October 2013. Jan-Gunnar Winther proposed the Constitution Voyage in 2014 when the schooner, Anna Rogde, sailed from Hammerfest to Oslo as part of the celebrations of the bicentenary of the drawing up of the Norwegian Constitution in 1814, to underline its significance and the opportunities it opened up for the Norwegian coast, viewed from a historic aspect and in the perspective of what the future holds.

Winther has published about 70 scientific articles, 170 chronicles and three books, Klimagåten Antarktis (Antarctica, a climatic mystery), Norge i Antarktis (Norway in the Antarctic) and a children's book, Snø, is og klima (Snow, ice and climate), all three in 2008. He holds a number of international appointments, including being a lead author on the UN Climate Panel, a member of United Nations Global Compact Action Platform for Sustainable Ocean Business, the World Economic Forum Friends of Ocean Action, China Council for Cooperation on Environment and Development, member of the expert group of the High-level panel for a Sustainable Ocean Economy, member of EU Mission Board Restore our Ocean and Waters, and a Norwegian expert on the Arctic Council and the Antarctic Treaty. He is a member of the Norwegian Academy of Technological Sciences and the Explorers Club.

References

Members of the Norwegian Academy of Technological Sciences
1962 births
Living people
Antarctic scientists